The red ribbon is an awareness ribbon used in support of HIV/AIDS causes.

Red ribbon may also refer to:

 Red Ribbon Army, a fictional army appearing in the Dragon Ball series
 Red Ribbon Bakeshop, a bakery and a subsidiary of Jollibee Foods Corporation based in the Philippines
 Red Ribbon Express, an HIV/AIDS awareness campaign train by the Indian Railways
 Red Ribbon Pairs, a national bridge championship held by the American Contract Bridge League
 Red Ribbon Rebellion, an 1853 protest/rebellion in Bendigo, Victoria, Australia
 Red Ribbon Week, a drug and violence prevention awareness campaign in the United States
 The Red Ribbon, a 1999 Iranian film
 Red ribbons, a species of wildflower
 The ribbon of the Order of the Bath
 One of the Medals of Honor (Japan)